Alexander Del Castillo Molina (born March 14, 1977) is a Colombian footballer who currently plays for Boyacá Chicó F.C. as a midfielder.

Clubs

Honors 
 Champions Colombian Primera A, 2006 Deportivo Cúcuta
 Semi-finalist of Copa Libertories with Cúcuta in 2007

External links
 BDFA profile

1987 births
Living people
Colombian footballers
América de Cali footballers
Deportes Quindío footballers
Millonarios F.C. players
Real Cartagena footballers
Cortuluá footballers
Atlético Bucaramanga footballers
C.D. ESPOLI footballers
Deportivo Pasto footballers
Cúcuta Deportivo footballers
Atlético Junior footballers
Deportivo Pereira footballers
Independiente Rivadavia footballers
Boyacá Chicó F.C. footballers
Categoría Primera A players
Colombian expatriate footballers
Expatriate footballers in Ecuador
Expatriate footballers in Argentina
Association football midfielders
Footballers from Cali